Delhi Football Club is an Indian professional football club from Delhi, which currently competes in the Delhi Premier League and the I-League 2.

History 
Delhi FC was founded in 1994 and competed in lower local divisions until 2009, when it was promoted to FD Senior Division. Affiliated with Football Delhi, the club is regularly participating in the top division of Delhi football league system, FD Senior Division, which also serves as I-League Second Division Qualifiers from 2021.

In August 2020, Minerva Academy owner Ranjit Bajaj took over Delhi FC by buying 90% stake in the club after selling Punjab FC to RoundGlass completely.

Delhi FC participated in the 130th edition of Durand Cup and reached to the quarter-finals, after beating ISL side Kerala Blasters in their final group match.

Stadium 

Ambedkar Stadium, located in Feroz Shah Kotla, Delhi, is the home ground of Delhi FC. The club also plays some matches at Jawaharlal Nehru Stadium.

Supporters 
Former Delhi Dynamos ultras have announced to support the club.

Kit manufacturers and shirt sponsors

Players

Out on loan

Personnel

Statistics and records

Seasons 

 Key

 Tms. = Number of teams
 Pos. = Position in league
 Attendance/G = Average league attendance

Head coaching record

Honours

Football

Domestic leagues 
I-League 2nd Division
Third place (1): 2021
FD Senior Division/Delhi Premier League
Champions (1): 2021–22
Runners-up (1): 2021 (Delhi 2nd Division Qualifiers)
DSA A Division
Runners-up (1): 2009 
DSA B Division
Champions (1): 2001

Domestic cups 
Bordoloi Trophy
Champions (1): 2022
Principal Harbhajan Singh Memorial Tournament
Champions (1): 2022
Shandar Football Tournament
Champions (1): 2021
Shaheed Bhagat Singh Cup
Champions (1): 2022
Chakradhar Deka Memorial Cup
Champions (1): 2022
All Open Football Tournament
Champions (1): 2022

Futsal

Domestic leagues 
Futsal Club Championship
Champions (1): 2021
Football Delhi Futsal League
Champions (1): 2021

Affiliated club(s) 
The following club is currently affiliated with Delhi FC:

  Minerva Academy FC (2020–present)

Futsal 
The club's futsal section takes part in Delhi Futsal League, and has won the inaugural edition of AIFF Futsal Club Championship, becoming the first Indian team to qualify for AFC Futsal Club Championship.

References

External links 

Delhi FC at Global Sports Archive

Football clubs in Delhi
I-League 2nd Division clubs